The  is a limited express train service in Japan operated by East Japan Railway Company (JR East).

Seasonal Shinjuku Sazanami services operate at certain weekends between Shinjuku and Tateyama.

Principal stations served  Tokyo - Soga - Goi - (Anegasaki) - Kisarazu - Kimitsu

Rolling stock
 E257-500 series 5-car EMUs

Former rolling stock
 255 series 9-car EMUs
 183/189 series 9-car EMUs

History
 15 July 1972 - Sazanami service starts coinciding with opening of the underground Sōbu Line platforms at Tokyo Station.
 16 March 1991 - Sazanami service are rerouted via the Keiyo Line from Tokyo.
 16 October 2004 - E257-500 series EMUs are introduced.
 10 December 2005 - The View Sazanami name is discontinued, and all services are made entirely no-smoking.

The opening of the Tokyo Bay Aqua-Line road across the Tokyo Bay in 1997 saw increased competition from long-distance bus services offering cheaper fares, resulting in decreasing ridership figures on the Sazanami services. From the start of the 15 March 2014 timetable revision, the number of services was reduced to six return workings daily.

See also
 List of named passenger trains of Japan

References

External links

 JR East 255 series Shiosai/Wakashio/Sazanami 
 JR East E257 series Wakashio/Sazanami/Shiosai/Ayame 

Named passenger trains of Japan
East Japan Railway Company
Railway services introduced in 1972
1972 establishments in Japan